Lissoglossa is a genus of parasitic flies in the family Tachinidae. There are at least two described species in Lissoglossa.

Species
These two species belong to the genus Lissoglossa:
 Lissoglossa bequaerti Villeneuve, 1912
 Lissoglossa taeniata Villeneuve, 1912

References

Further reading

 
 
 
 

Tachinidae
Articles created by Qbugbot